Kim Larsen is a Norwegian football forward who last played for Manglerud Star.

During his professional career Larsen played for Skeid, Odd Grenland and Tromsø in Tippeligaen, Kalmar FF in Allsvenskan and Herfølge in the Danish 1st Division. Larsen also played for several clubs in the lower divisions in Norway.

References

1976 births
Living people
Norwegian footballers
Association football forwards
Skeid Fotball players
Odds BK players
Raufoss IL players
Strømsgodset Toppfotball players
Tromsø IL players
Herfølge Boldklub players
Kalmar FF players
FK Tønsberg players
Manglerud Star Toppfotball players
Norwegian First Division players
Eliteserien players
Allsvenskan players
Norwegian expatriate footballers
Expatriate men's footballers in Denmark
Norwegian expatriate sportspeople in Denmark
Expatriate footballers in Sweden
Norwegian expatriate sportspeople in Sweden
Footballers from Oslo